The Rural Municipality of Moosomin No. 121 is a rural municipality (RM) in the Canadian province of Saskatchewan within Census Division No. 5 and  Division No. 1. It is located in the southeast portion of the province.

History 
The RM of Moosomin No. 121 incorporated as a rural municipality on January 1, 1913.

Geography 
Moosomin and District Regional Park, upstream from Moosomin Dam, and Moosomin Lake are located in the RM. The black swallowtail (papilio polyxenes asterius), a species of special concern, makes its home in this area.

Communities and localities 
The following urban municipalities are surrounded by the RM.

Towns
Fleming
Moosomin

The following unincorporated communities are within the RM.

Special service areas
Welwyn

Localities
Rotave

Demographics 

Attractions 
Moosomin is home to the Lily Wind Farm and Moosomin Lake Regional Park.

Government 
The RM of Moosomin No. 121 is governed by an elected municipal council and an appointed administrator that meets on the second Thursday of every month. The reeve of the RM is David Moffatt while its administrator is Kendra Lawrence. The RM's office is located in Moosomin.

Transportation 
Highway 1 (the Trans-Canada Highway) and Highway 8 intersect within this RM.

References 

M

Division No. 5, Saskatchewan